NBC 23 may refer to one of the following television stations in the United States:

Current
KAGS-LD in Bryan/College Station, Texas
KMCB in Coos Bay, Oregon
Full satellite of KMTR in Eugene, OR
KNDO in Yakima, Washington
KVEO-TV in Brownsville, Texas
WRGX-LD in Dothan, Alabama

Former
KCEB in Tulsa, Oklahoma (1954)
KERO-TV in Bakersfield, California (1963 to 1984)
WFTL-TV/WGBS-TV in Miami, Florida (1954 to 1956)